

First round

Group A

Group B

Second round

Azadegan League seasons
Iran
2001–02 in Iranian football leagues